Krystyna Marszałek-Młyńczyk (1930-2007) was a Soviet-Polish Politician (Communist).

She was a member of the Polish Council of State, making her a member of the Collective Head of State, in 1980–1983.

References

1930 births
20th-century Polish women politicians
20th-century Polish politicians
Polish communists
2007 deaths
Recipient of the Meritorious Activist of Culture badge